Love: Single's Best 2005–2010 is American pop singer Yuna Ito's first greatest hit album. The album was released on December 8, 2010 under her label Studioseven Recordings. The album was released in three formats: CD-only, a limited CD+DVD version and a 2 CD version. The CD+DVD version contains all her PVs plus a special video. The 2CD version contains an extra CD with English covers that Yuna covered over her career.

Track listing

Charts

References

External links
 Official website 

Yuna Ito albums
2010 albums